The Broadmoor Trophy is a trophy that has been awarded to the Western Collegiate Hockey Association (WCHA) playoff champion since 1985.  The trophy itself dates to 1981, when it was awarded to the WCHA regular season champion for three seasons, from 1981–82 to 1983–84.  During that time, the Broadmoor Trophy served as the replacement for the MacNaughton Cup, traditionally awarded to the WCHA regular season champion.  The trophy is named after The Broadmoor resort in Colorado Springs, Colorado, which has a long history of supporting college hockey.

History

The Broadmoor Trophy was commissioned as a replacement for the MacNaughton Cup, held in trust by Michigan Tech.  In 1981, Michigan Tech left the WCHA for the Central Collegiate Hockey Association, taking the Cup with them.  To fill the void, The Broadmoor resort presented a new trophy to the WCHA to award to their regular season champion.

When Michigan Tech returned to the WCHA in 1984, the school returned the MacNaughton Cup to the league.  The MacNaughton Cup returned to being awarded to the WCHA regular season champion, while the Broadmoor Trophy began being awarded to the playoff champion.

The trophy was redesigned in 2010.  The new bronze cast trophy, created by Blue Ribbon Trophies & Awards of Colorado Springs, Colo., is a recreation of the famous The Broadmoor resort.

Champions
The Broadmoor Trophy has been awarded every year since 1982.  From 1982 to 1984, the trophy was awarded to the WCHA regular season champions.  
North Dakota's 8 Broadmoor trophies leads the WCHA.  Minnesota is second with 7.

 * Currently compete in WCHA

See also
Western Collegiate Hockey Association men's champions

References

Western Collegiate Hockey Association
College ice hockey trophies and awards in the United States
Sports trophies and awards